Macrobrachium scabriculum is a species of freshwater shrimp. It is distributed in countries and territories around the Indian Ocean (East Africa, Madagascar, South Asia, Sumatra). It is known as Goda River prawn. The total length of male prawns become about 6.5 cm long and in females it is about 5 cm. A kind of fur develop on the chelipeds of males. Eggs produced by M. scabriculum are smaller in size, brownish in color, elliptical or oval in shape and hatched larvae undergone migration to low saline water for completion its life cycle.

Macrobrachium scabriculum inhabit fresh and brackish water of larger rivers and streams.

References

Palaemonidae
Freshwater crustaceans of Africa
Freshwater crustaceans of Asia
Crustaceans described in 1862